Moricandia arvensis, the purple mistress, is a species of flowering plant in the family Brassicaceae. It has a broadly western Mediterranean distribution, from the Canary Islands to northern Africa including Mauritania and Chad, the Iberian Peninsula, Italy and as far as Greece, and has been introduced to France, Corsica, and Sardinia. It has an intermediate C–C carbon fixation system, known as C photosynthesis.

References

Brassicaceae
Flora of the Canary Islands
Flora of Mauritania
Flora of Morocco
Flora of Algeria
Flora of Tunisia
Flora of Libya
Flora of Chad
Flora of Portugal
Flora of Spain
Flora of the Balearic Islands
Flora of Italy
Flora of Sicily
Flora of Greece
Plants described in 1821